Ronald Segovia (born 17 January 1985) in Villa Montes, Tarija, Bolivia, is a footballer who plays as an attacking midfielder. He currently a free agent.

Club career

La Paz
In 2009, he signed for Bolivian club La Paz where he managed 5 goals in 63 games.

Aurora
In 2011, he signed for Liga de Fútbol Profesional Boliviano club Aurora. In June 2012, Segovia signed a one-year contract with Club Blooming.

International career
On 11 November 2011 he made his debut for the Bolivia national football team in a 2014 World Cup qualifier match against Argentina

References

External links
 

1985 births
Living people
Sportspeople from Santa Cruz de la Sierra
Bolivian footballers
Club Aurora players
Club Blooming players
C.D. Jorge Wilstermann players
Bolivia international footballers
Association football midfielders